Christine Fugate (born 1964) is an American film director of documentary films, writer, and professor of film at Chapman University.

Fugate is known for her documentaries and independent films. She is also a journalist, interviewer, and author of Mothering Heights, a column which was published in the Laguna Beach Independent. In 2008, she edited a collection of essays by women sharing diverse perspectives on the same subject, The Mothering Heights Manual for Motherhood, Volume I.

Life 
Fugate was born in Los Angeles. She completed a Master of Fine Arts in Asian film and theater at the University of Hawaii, and her thesis, The Power to Choose: Women in Thai Film, 1975–1990, is on file at the university's library. She returned to Los Angeles in the nineties to begin her work as a filmmaker.

Career 
Fugate began her career in 1990 as French director Barbet Schroeder's assistant for the film, Single White Female. Subsequently, she worked as Creative Vice President for Pacific Rim Productions where she was an Associate Producer on the HBO film, Natural Causes', in 1994.

In the late 1990s, Fugate produced and directed a series of independent films, including The Southern Sex (1992), Mother Love (1996), Tobacco Blues (1998) and The Girl Next Door (1999). Fugate rendered the poetry of writer Donna Hilbert for the screen in Grief Becomes Me (2005), which premiered at the Kentucky Women Writers Conference and at the Los Angeles International Short Film Festival. Fugate went on to create a biopic connecting Hilbert's life and work, titled Grief Becomes Me: A Love Story (2009).

Filmography 
 The Southern Sex (1992)
 Mother Love (1996)
 Tobacco Blues (1998)
 The Girl Next Door (1999)
 Grief Becomes Me (Short Film) (2006)
 Grief Becomes Me: A Love Story (2009)

References

External links 
 Official Website
 

Living people
American documentary filmmakers
American women journalists
Writers from Lexington, Kentucky
University of Hawaiʻi alumni
Journalists from California
Kentucky women writers
Kentucky women directors
Film directors from Los Angeles
1964 births
Film directors from Kentucky
American women documentary filmmakers
21st-century American women